Old Liquidator is the debut full-length album by American rock band The Minus 5. It was released in 1995 by East Side Digital Records. Recording sessions for the album were recorded simultaneously with their Hello EP debut. The sessions that produced this album and the following EP were followed up with The Lonesome Death of Buck McCoy, released in 1997.

Critical reception

In a brief review for Billboard, the album was given a positive reception for its catchiness and breadth of songwriting. The editorial staff of AllMusic Guide gave the release four out of five stars.

Track listing
All songs written by Scott McCaughey, except where noted
 "Winter Goes Away" – 4:06
 "Worse" – 2:46
 "All the Time" – 3:49
 "Find a Finger" – 3:04
 "Emperor of the Bathroom" – 3:22
 "Vulture" – 3:39
 "Algerian Hook" – 2:40
 "Story" – 3:56
 "How Many Bones" – 3:20
 "Basing Street" (Nick Lowe) – 3:06
 "No More Glory" – 5:20
 "When It Comes My Way" – 3:45
 "House of Four Doors (Theme)" – 0:57
 "Brotherhood of Pain" – 2:40
 "Heartache for Sale" – 3:05
 "Drunkard's Lullaby" – 1:54
 "House of Four Doors" – 0:48

Hello EP track listing
All songs written by Scott McCaughey
"Loser So Supreme" – 3:16
"Only One Thing" – 2:54
"Brotherhood of Pain" – 2:41
"Drunkards Lullaby" – 1:54

Emperor of the Bathroom
In 1995, East Side Digital Records released this EP featuring alternate takes from the Old Liquidator sessions.

All songs written by Scott McCaughey, except where noted
"Emperor of the Bathroom" (Video Mix) – 3:26
"Heartache for Sale" – 3:07
"Story" (Alternate Mix) – 4:13
"Vulture" (Take 2) (Alternate Version) – 3:56
"This Little Woody" (Steve Barri and P. F. Sloan) – 2:58

Personnel

Hello EP personnel
The Minus 5
Terry Adams
Tom Ardolino
Jon Auer
Peter Buck
Scott McCaughey (including production)
Jim Sangster
Ken Stringfellow

Technical personnel
Conrad Uno – production

Old Liquidator personnel
The Minus 5
Terry Adams – piano
Tom Ardolino – piano
Jon Auer – rhythm guitar, percussion, violin, backing vocals
Peter Buck – 12-string guitar, bass guitar, bouzouki, dulcimer, bassoon, drums
Amy Denio – saxophone
Chris Eckman – cello, guitar
Scott McCaughey – banjo, bass guitar, guitar, vocals, drums, harmonica, organ, percussion, piano, production
Richard Peterson – French horn, piano, trombone, trumpet
Jim Sangster – bass guitar
Ken Stringfellow – bass guitar, bassoon, drums, guitar, harmonica, piano, vibraphone, vocals, associate production
Carla Torgerson – cello

Technical personnel
Kearney Barton – recording
Art Chantry – artwork
Mark Guenther – recording
Pat Gray – recording
Nadine McCaughey – illustrations
Marty Perez – photography
Michael Shuler – engineering
Conrad Uno – recording, production

Emperor of the Bathroom personnel
The Minus 5
Terry Adams – piano on "Vulture" (Take 2) (Alternate Version)
Jon Auer – guitar on "Emperor of the Bathroom" (Video Mix)
Peter Buck – 12-string guitar and bouzouki on "Emperor of the Bathroom" (Video Mix) and "Heartache for Sale", drums on "Story" (Alternate Mix)
Scott McCaughey – guitar, vocals, bass guitar, and tambourine on "Emperor of the Bathroom" (Video Mix); vocals, guitar, organ, and tambourine on "Heartache for Sale"; guitar, bass guitar, vocals, and loops on "Story" (Alternate Mix); vocals and acoustic guitar on "Vulture" (Take 2) (Alternate Version); all instrumentation on "This Little Woody"; production on all tracks
Ken Stringfellow – drums on "Emperor of the Bathroom" (Video Mix), guitar on "Heartache for Sale", drums on "Story" (Alternate Mix)

Technical personnel
Kearney Barton – recording
Mark Guenther – recording
Pat Gray – recording
Marty Perez – photography
Conrad Uno – recording, production

References

External links

Old Liquidator at Rate Your Music

Official page for Emperor of the Bathroom

Emperor of the Bathroom at Rate Your Music

1995 debut albums
Albums produced by Conrad Uno
East Side Digital Records EPs
The Minus 5 albums